Pieter Jacobus Hagen (1942) is a Dutch journalist and non-fiction author, who started his career as a reporter for the national newspaper Trouw in 1967. Later he served as teacher and dean of the School of Journalism in Utrecht (1983–1995), editor-in-chief of De Journalist/Villamedia (1995–2002), and columnist for NRC Handelsblad (2003–2005). He has been publishing non-fiction books since 1982, and has been a full-time author of history books since 2002.

In his books on blood transfusion (1982 and 1993) he criticized the commercialization of human blood and plasma components. In 2010, he published a biography of Dutch politician Pieter Jelles Troelstra, for which he was awarded the triennial Dr. Joast Halbertsmaprijs in the Dutch province of Friesland in 2012. His overview of colonial wars in Indonesia (2018) offers a new perspective on the past five centuries: military violence was the backbone of colonialism.

Bibliography
Blood: Gift or Merchandise, New York, 1982
Hoe wij leren lezen, Tilburg, 1984
Wetenschap in het nieuws, Groningen, 1991
Blood transfusion in Europe, a white paper, Council of Europe, 1993
Journalisten in Nederland, een persgeschiedenis in portretten, Amsterdam, 2002
Politicus uit hartstocht, biografie van Pieter Jelles Troelstra, Amsterdam, 2010
Koloniale oorlogen in Indonesië, Amsterdam, 2018
Dubbel zondebok. Joodse journalisten in tijden van antisemitisme en vervolging 1920-1945, Amsterdam, 2022

References

External links
 De Arbeiderspers profile

Living people
1942 births
Date of birth missing (living people)
20th-century Dutch journalists
20th-century Dutch non-fiction writers
People from Zwijndrecht, Netherlands